Die Bahnwelt is a multi-directional Run and gun that was released for the Sharp X68000 in 1992 by Glodia.

Gameplay

The player directly moves one character in three dimensions in an overhead perspective through science fiction themed dungeons. The player can shoot in eight directions. There are also different second characters that the player can indirectly control through AI. There are multiple weapons that can be collected that can be switched at will. There is a life bar that regenerates if no damage is taken for a period of time. The game has a save system. The game also contains many anime cutscenes. There is an English fan translation available for this game. The game is currently freeware.

References

External links
 bwmain
 

Japan-exclusive video games
X68000 games
X68000-only games
1992 video games
Video games developed in Japan